Badminton, for the 2015 Island Games, was held at the New Gilson Hall. It is located in Saint Martin, Jersey. With a practice day on 27 June, the events took place from 28 June to 3 July 2015.

Medal table
Final medal tally, based on the 2015 IG Badminton Medal Table page:

Medal summary

References

Island Games
2015 Island Games
Badminton tournaments in England
2015